Mahamé Siby (born 7 July 1996) is a French professional footballer who plays as a midfielder for Allsvenskan club Malmö FF.

Career 
Siby is a youth product of Bobigny, and moved to Valenciennes on 28 May 2018. He made his professional debut with the club in a 1–0 Ligue 2 loss to Chamois Niortais on 4 December 2018. On 4 October 2021, he joined Paris FC on a season-long loan.

On 29 June 2022, Siby signed a contract with Malmö FF in Sweden until the end of 2026.

Personal life
Born in France, Siby is of Malian descent.

References

External links
 
 

1996 births
Living people
Footballers from Paris
Association football midfielders
French footballers
French sportspeople of Malian descent
Black French sportspeople
Football Club 93 Bobigny-Bagnolet-Gagny players
Valenciennes FC players
RC Strasbourg Alsace players
Paris FC players
Malmö FF players
Ligue 1 players
Ligue 2 players
Championnat National 3 players
French expatriate footballers
Expatriate footballers in Sweden
French expatriate sportspeople in Sweden